Paik Seung-ho (born 17 March 1997) is a South Korean professional footballer who plays as a midfielder for Jeonbuk Hyundai Motors and the South Korea national team. Starting playing football since May in 2005 in a football academy, Baekk was awarded MVP award in juvenile team and MVP award from KFA(Korea Football Association) in youth team for the first time at the age of 11. While he played in FC Barcelona youth team at the age of 13, he was expected to join FC Barcelona A for the first time as Korean player.

Early life

In 2009, as a member of Seoul Daedong Elementary School, he played 18 games in the Elementary Weekend League and scored 30 goals. Since then, he has received attention as an outstanding prospect, winning the 22nd Cha Bum-keun Football Grand Prize. In December, he participated in the 1st Korea-Catalonia Youth Cup in Barcelona, Spain as a member of the South Korean U-14 national football team, and was offered a contract as a result of his impressive performance. However, he was already scouted by Maetan Middle School, a youth team of Samsung Bluewings in Suwon, and was scheduled to enter, but Samsung Bluewings decided to send Paik Seung-ho to Spain with a long term vision and also to support him.

Paik Seung-ho played for Maetan Middle School, U-15 youth team of the Suwon Samsung Bluewings until March 2010, before moving to FC Barcelona's Under 13 youth team, Infantil A, in April 2010. In July 2011, Paik signed a five-year contract with FC Barcelona's youth team, leaving him in Barcelona's uniform until the age of 19. However, in February 2013, FIFA suspended six players, including Paik, from FC Barcelona's youth team, for violating Article 19 of the FIFA Rules that made Paik not participate in FC Barcelona's official matches until January 2016. After the disciplinary action was released in January 2016, he played actively for FC Barcelona Juvenile A, and made his professional debut on 21 February, as a substitute in Segunda División B match with Levante UD in the 45th minute of the second half.

Club career

Girona
He played for Barcelona as a youth player for seven years, but he had difficulty competing in the senior team. On 21 July 2017, he joined Girona and played for Peralada, the reserve team of Girona at that time, in the Segunda División B. He made his first team debut on 10 January 2019 in the Copa del Rey.

Darmstadt 98
On 31 August 2019, Paik signed for 2. Bundesliga side Darmstadt 98 on a three-year deal. He played for Darmstadt for one and a half years.

Jeonbuk Hyundai Motors
Paik returned to his native South Korea in March 2021, joining Jeonbuk Hyundai Motors.

International career
He made his South Korea national team debut on 11 June 2019 in a friendly against Iran, as a starter.

Career statistics

Club

International goals
Scores and results list South Korea's goal tally first.

Honours

Jeonbuk Hyundai Motors
K League 1: 2021
Korean FA Cup: 2022

References

External links

1997 births
Living people
Footballers from Seoul
Association football midfielders
South Korean footballers
South Korea under-20 international footballers
South Korea international footballers
La Liga players
Segunda División B players
2. Bundesliga players
FC Barcelona Atlètic players
CF Peralada players
Girona FC players
FC Barcelona players
SV Darmstadt 98 players
Jeonbuk Hyundai Motors players
South Korean expatriate footballers
South Korean expatriate sportspeople in Spain
Expatriate footballers in Spain
South Korean expatriate sportspeople in Germany
Expatriate footballers in Germany
2022 FIFA World Cup players